Rose is a 2011 Polish film directed by Wojciech Smarzowski. It depicts the love story of a Masurian woman and an officer of the Armia Krajowa in postwar Masuria.

Plot
In summer 1945 Tadeusz, an officer of the Armia Krajowa and veteran of the Warsaw uprising, whose wife was raped and murdered by the Germans, moves to Masuria, a region in former German East Prussia, which became part of Poland as a result of the Potsdam Agreement after World War II. He visits Róża, a widow of a German Wehrmacht soldier whose death Tadeusz had witnessed, to hand over her husband’s possessions. Róża invites Tadeusz to stay at her farm to protect her against marauders and the brutal rapes she had previously experienced during the Soviet East Prussian Offensive and in the lawless atmosphere of postwar Masuria. From this partnership of purpose, slowly respect and love arises - a "frowned-upon relationship" attracting the "unwelcome attention of the new Polish nationalists as well as the notorious Soviet NKVD".

While Róża is regarded a German by the new Polish authorities, thus facing her expulsion, Tadeusz wants her to declare her Polish nationality as many Masurians did in a "humiliating nationality verification procedure"

As director Wojciech Smarzowski calls it, the Masurians "fell victim to two instances of renationalisation and were later destroyed".

Cast
Agata Kulesza as Róża Kwiatkowska
Marcin Dorociński as Tadeusz
Edward Linde-Lubaszenko as pastor
Szymon Bobrowski as Kazik
Jacek Braciak as Władek
Malwina Buss as Jadwiga Kwiatkowska
Kinga Preis as Amelia
Marian Dziędziel as Mateusz
Eryk Lubos as Wasyl
Lech Dyblik as Woźniak
Robert Wabich as Hawryluk
Grzegorz Wojdon as Madecki
Mateusz Trembaczowski as Georg

Reception

Variety has called the movie "almost unbearably brutal yet hauntingly romantic" and commended "Genre-savvy helmer Smarzowski's gritty mise-en-scene augments the force of the narrative, putting into visual terms its themes of ill-fated love and a nation doomed by nationalism. What in other hands might have played as costume melodrama focused on the victimized title character here takes the perspective of the loner hero, as Smarzowski gives the pic the hallmarks of a latter-day Western."

Giuseppe Sedia in a review for the Krakow Post wrote: "From a moral point of view Róża is a Western crammed with violence but filmed without complacency. Smarzowski referred to himself as the “third Cohen brother” and there may be a kernel of truth in this, at least in his commitment to injecting a dose of realism into movie genres that have never been fully developed in Polish cinema"."

Róża distribution in Russia has been banned by authorities in 2015 for depicting rapes and other atrocities committed by Red Army soldiers in East Prussia.

Awards
Grand Prix, Warsaw Film Festival 2011
Polish Film Awards: Best Film, Best Directing, Best Actress, Best Supporting Actor, Best Script, Best Sound and the Audience Award
Critics' Award National Film Festival in Gdynia 2011
Special Jury Prize of the 23rd Polish Film Festival in America for Artistic Excellence and Importance

References

External links

Wojciech Smarzowski - Rose at culture.pl

2011 films
2011 war drama films
2010s Polish-language films
Polish war drama films
Polish World War II films
Films about Polish resistance during World War II